Abdou Alassane Dji Bo (born 15 June 1979) is a Nigerien judoka. He is a three-time medallist at the African Judo Championships.

He competed at the 2004 Summer Olympics and was Niger's first-ever Olympic judoka, having learned the sport with an Olympic scholarship.

He was a bronze medal in the half lightweight category at the 2006 African Judo Championships.

International competitions

References

External links
 

1979 births
Living people
Nigerien male judoka
Olympic judoka of Niger
Judoka at the 2004 Summer Olympics